Abhimann Roy is an Indian film score and soundtrack composer. He has predominantly scored music for Kannada films. He has also sung few of his own compositions.

Roy debuted as a music composer in 2001 for the film Kullara loka and has since been composing for many commercial feature films in Kannada. Roy has won the Best Music Director Award from the Government of Karnataka for the year 2008-09 for the film, Taj Mahal.

Discography

External links
 G. Abhimann Roy
 Abhimann Roy's music galaxy

References

Living people
Kannada film score composers
Kannada playback singers
1979 births
Indian male playback singers
Musicians from Bangalore
Film musicians from Karnataka
21st-century Indian composers
Male film score composers
21st-century Indian male singers
21st-century Indian singers